Scott Waguespack (born June 23, 1970) is a member of the Chicago City Council, representing the 32nd ward since May 2007. The current 32nd ward includes parts of the neighborhoods of Bucktown, Goose Island, Hamlin Park, Lakeview, Lincoln Park, and Roscoe Village. He is a member of the council's Progressive Reform Caucus, and was the chair during 2015–19. During the 2019–23 term, he was selected as the chair of the Finance Committee.

Background
Waguespack earned his undergraduate degree in political science at Colorado State University and a law degree from Chicago-Kent College of Law, Illinois Institute of Technology. After college, he served in the U.S. Peace Corps in Kenya working on clean water construction projects in schools, hospitals and women's clinics. Waguespack also served as an advisor to the President of Kosovo and has extensive experience working on nation-building projects in the Former Yugoslavia and Albania in cooperation with the Chicago-Kent College of Law, IIT Balkans project. He was a member of the Chicago Council on Global Affairs.

Waguespack was the city administrator and chief of staff to Berwyn mayor Michael A. O'Connor in 2005.

Aldermanic career
Waguespack was first elected as Chicago alderman for the 32nd Ward in 2007, unseating incumbent alderman Theodore Matlak. He has subsequently been reelected in 2011, 2015, and 2019.

Waguespack is a member of the following committees:

 Budget and Government Operations
 Committees, Rules and Ethics
 Education and Child Development
 Finance; Human Relations
 License and Consumer Protection
 Special Events, Cultural Affairs and Recreation.

He is also a founding member of the Chicago City Council's Progressive Reform Coalition, and has served as chair of the Progressive Reform Caucus since 2015. Waguespack is also a member of Local Progress, a network of hundreds of local elected officials from around the country committed to a strong economy, equal justice, livable cities, and effective government. Waguespack is also the current Democratic Committeeman for the 32nd ward.

In the 2019 Chicago mayoral election, Waguespack endorsed Lori Lightfoot, publicly declaring his support of her candidacy in advance of the first round of the election. Waguespack has been a City Council ally of Lightfoot during her mayoralty. He has endorsed her for reelection in the 2023 Chicago mayoral election. During Lightfoot's mayoralty, Waguespack has served as chair of the City Council's finance committee.

In January 2020, Waguespack proposed legislation that would have placed limits on single-use plastics and foam food containers by giving give restaurants and take-out establishments until January 1, 2021, to stop selling or serving food in polystyrene containers and limit use of plastic utensils and straws.

Democratic committeeman
Waguespack ran for the unpaid-political position of Democratic Committeeman in the March 2012 Democratic Party Primary Election. The incumbent, Cook County Commissioner John Fritchey dropped out of the race on February 15, 2012, citing residential constraints as a barrier to further holding that office.
Scott Waguespack went on to win the race.

References

External links
32nd Ward website
Scott Waguespack political website

1970 births
21st-century American politicians
Chicago City Council members
Colorado State University alumni
Illinois Democrats
Illinois Institute of Technology alumni
Living people
Peace Corps volunteers